The Tank, Infantry, Mk III, Valentine was an infantry tank produced in the United Kingdom during World War II. More than 8,000 of the type were produced in eleven marks, plus various specialised variants, accounting for approximately a quarter of wartime British tank production. The many variants included riveted and welded construction, petrol and diesel engines and a progressive increase in armament. It was supplied in large numbers to the USSR and built under licence in Canada. It was used extensively by the British in the North African campaign. Developed by Vickers, it proved to be both strong and reliable.

Name
There are several proposed explanations for the name Valentine. According to the most popular one, the design was presented to the War Office on St Valentine's Day, 14 February 1940, although some sources say that the design was submitted on Valentine's Day 1938 or 10 February 1938. White notes that "incidentally" Valentine was the middle name of Sir John Carden, the man who was responsible for many tank designs including that of the Valentine's predecessors, the A10 and A11. Another version says that Valentine is an acronym for Vickers-Armstrongs Limited Elswick & (Newcastle-upon) Tyne. The "most prosaic" explanation according to author David Fletcher is that it was just an in-house codeword of Vickers with no other significance.

Development
The Valentine started as a proposal based on Vickers' experience with the A9 and A10 specification cruiser tanks and the A11 (Infantry Tank Mk I). As a private design by Vickers-Armstrongs, it did not receive a General Staff "A" designation; it was submitted to the War Office on 10 February 1938. The development team tried to match the lower weight of a cruiser tank, allowing the suspension and transmission parts of the A10 heavy cruiser to be used, with the greater armour of an infantry tank, working to a specification for a  armour basis (the same as the A.11).

The tank was to carry a 2-pounder gun in a two-man turret (the A.11 was armed only  with a heavy machine gun), a lower silhouette and be as light as possible, resulting in a very compact vehicle with a cramped interior. Compared to the earlier Infantry Tank Mk II "Matilda", the Valentine had somewhat weaker armour and almost the same top speed. By using components already proven on the A9 and A10, the new design was easier to produce and much less expensive.

The War Office was initially deterred by the size of the turret, since they considered a turret crew of three necessary, to free the vehicle commander from direct involvement in operating the gun. Concerned by the situation in Europe, it finally approved the design in April 1939 and placed the first order in July for deliveries in May 1940. At the start of the war, Vickers were instructed to give priority to the production of tanks. The vehicle reached trials in May 1940, which coincided with the loss of much of the army's equipment in France, during Operation Dynamo, the evacuation from Dunkirk. The trials were successful and the vehicle was rushed into production as "Tank, Infantry, Mark III"; no pilot models were required as much of the mechanics had been proven on the A10, and 109 had been built by the end of September. During late 1940 and early 1941, Valentines were used in the cruiser tank role in British-based armoured divisions, and they were supplied to tank brigades of the Eighth Army in North Africa from June 1941.

Production

Metropolitan-Cammell Carriage & Wagon—an associate company of Vickers—and Birmingham Railway Carriage & Wagon Company (BRCW) were contracted to produce the Valentine. Metropolitan and the BRCW had built small numbers of the A10, their production runs were just finishing and they delivered their first Valentines in mid-1940. Metropolitan used two sites, with Wednesbury joined by their Midland site in production of the Valentine. Vickers output started at ten per month rising to 45 per month in a year and peaking at 20 per week in 1943, before production was slowed and then production of the Valentine and derivatives stopped in 1945. Vickers-Armstrong produced 2,515 vehicles and Metropolitan 2,135; total UK production was 6,855 tanks, with 2,394 exported from Britain to the Soviet Union under lend-lease.

To develop its own tank forces, Canada had established tank production facilities. An order was placed in 1940 with Canadian Pacific and after modifications to the Valentine design to use local standards and materials, the production prototype was finished in 1941. Canadian production was mainly at CPR Angus Shops in Montreal and 1,420 were produced in Canada, of which 1,388 were sent to the Soviet-Union. They formed the main Commonwealth export to the Soviet Union under lend-lease. The remaining 32 were retained for training. The use of local GMC Detroit Diesel two-stroke engines in Canadian production was a success and the engine was adopted for British production. British and Canadian production totalled 8,275, making the Valentine the most produced British tank design of the war.

Vehicle layout

The Valentine was of conventional layout, divided internally into three compartments; from front to back the driver's position, the fighting compartment with the turret and then the engine and transmission driving the tracks through rear sprockets. The driver's area contained only the driver and the driving controls. The driver sat on hull centre line, entering through either of two angled hatches over the seat, though there was an emergency exit hatch beneath his seat. The driver had a direct vision port—cut in what was one of the hull cross members—in front of him and two periscopes in the roof over his head. Driving was by clutch and brake steering through levers, whose control rods ran the length of the hull to the transmission at the rear.

Behind the driver was a bulkhead that formed another hull cross-member and separated him from the fighting compartment. The first tanks had a two-man turret, the gunner on the left of the gun and the commander acting also as the loader on the right. When three-man turrets were introduced, the commander sat to the rear of the turret. The turret was made up of a cast front and a cast rear riveted to the side plates which were of rolled steel.  All tanks carried the radio in the turret rear. Early tanks used the Wireless set No. 11 with a Tannoy for the crew; later tanks had Wireless Set No. 19, which included crew communications with long and short range networks.

Turret rotation was by electric motor controlled by the gunner, with a hand-wheel for manual backup. The restrictions that the two-man turret placed on the commander, made more so if they were a troop commander and responsible for directing the actions of two other tanks besides their own, were addressed by enlarging the turret for the Mark III so that a loader for the main armament could be carried. The turret ring diameter was not changed, so the extra space was found by moving the gun mounting forward in an extended front plate and increasing the bulge in the rear of the turret. This increased weight by half a ton on the  two-man turret.

A bulkhead separated the fighting compartment from the engine compartment. The engine, clutch and gearbox were bolted together to form a single unit. The first Valentines used a petrol engine and the diesel engine which distinguished the Mark II—at the time Tank Infantry Mark III*— from the Mark I, was based on the AEC Comet, a commercial road vehicle engine. The Mark IV used a GMC Detroit Diesel; these were the majority of those used in the desert campaigns. The gearbox was a 5-speed, 1-reverse Meadows connected to the multiplate steering clutches which then fed epicyclic reduction gearboxes on the sides of the tanks. The brakes themselves were on the outside of the drive sprockets. The suspension was made up of two units on either side; each unit made up of a single  diameter wheel and two  wheels. Improved tracks were added to later marks.

Combat history

North Africa

The Valentine was extensively used in the North African Campaign, earning a reputation as a reliable and well-protected vehicle. The first Valentines went into action in December 1941 with the 8th Royal Tank Regiment in Operation Crusader. The tank first served in Operation Crusader in the North African desert, when it began to replace the Matilda Tank. Due to a lack of cruisers, it was issued to armoured regiments in the UK from mid-1941. The Valentine was better armed and faster than the Cruiser Mk II.

The Valentine shared the common weakness of the British tanks of the period in that its 2-pounder gun lacked high-explosive (anti-personnel) ammunition and soon became outdated as an anti-tank weapon. Introduction of the 6-pounder in British service was delayed until the loss of equipment in France had been made good, so the 2-pounder was retained longer.

The small size of the turret and of the turret ring meant that producing mountings for larger guns proved a difficult task. Although versions with the 6-pounder and then with the Ordnance QF 75 mm gun were developed, by the time they were available in significant numbers, better tanks had reached the battlefield. Another weakness was the small crew compartment and the two-man turret. A larger turret, with a loader position added, was used in some of the 2-pounder versions but the position had to be removed again in variants with larger guns. Its relatively low height was an advantage in a battlefield with little cover, allowing it to take up a "good hull-down position in any convenient fold in the ground".

Madagascar
Six Valentines of 'B' Special Service Squadron of the Royal Armoured Corps took part in the 1942 Battle of Madagascar with six Tetrarchs of 'C' Special Service Squadron.

Northwest Europe
By 1944, the Valentine had been almost replaced in front-line units of the European theatre by the Churchill tank (the Infantry Tank Mark IV) and the US-made M4 Sherman tank. A few were used for special purposes or as command vehicles for units equipped with the Archer self-propelled gun. The Royal Artillery used the Valentine XI (with 75 mm gun) as an OP command tank until the end of the war.

Pacific
In the Pacific War, 25 Valentine Mk III and nine Valentine Mk IIICS tanks were employed by the 3rd New Zealand Division in the south-west Pacific campaign. Trials in New Zealand had found that the locally developed 2 pounder HE shell lacked power, especially compared to the 18-pounder shell of the 3-inch howitzer, so 18 Valentine Mk III were converted to Valentine Mk IIICS standard by having their main armament replaced by the QF 3-inch howitzer taken from Matilda Mk IVCS tanks, surplus to New Zealand requirements. Other modifications to the nine Valentine Mk IIICS tanks deploying to the Pacific included Infantry telephones (a means for infantry to talk to the tank commander). The converted tanks carried 21 HE and 14 smoke shells. The other nine 3-inch armed tanks and 16 normal Valentines (with 2-pounder guns) remained in New Zealand for training. The Valentine was retired from New Zealand service in 1960.

Eastern Front

Valentines, of most all Marks except the Mark I, were sent to the USSR from 1941. The creation of Valentines tanks destined for use by the Soviet Union was a part of a campaign known as Aid to Russia Fund, headed by Clementine Churchill and heavily supported by the Communist Party of Great Britain. In Soviet service, the Valentine was used from the Battle of Moscow until the end of the war, mainly in the second line. Although criticised for its low speed and the 2-pounder gun, the Valentine was liked due to its small size, reliability and good armour protection. Initially the tracks gave some problems in winter; from freezing down to minus 20, snow packed into the tracks, though at below minus 20 it was not a problem. The problem was later solved.

Soviet Supreme Command asked for its production until the end of the war. In August 1945, as part of the Soviet invasion of Manchuria,  the 267th Tank Regiment (40 Valentine III and IX) of the 59th Cavalry Division Red Army, together with the 65th T-34-85 43rd Tank Brigade, passed from Eastern Gobi across the mountains Greater Khingan to Kalgan in China.

Cyprus
The last use of a Valentine in combat is thought to have occurred during the Cyprus crisis of 1963–64. A turretless Valentine from a quarry was used by Greek militia, fitted with an improvised armoured casemate from which a gunner could fire a Bren gun. The vehicle is owned by the Cypriot National Guard, who intend to place it in a proposed new military museum.

Variants

Valentine I (Tank, Infantry, Mk III): (308)
 The first model of the Valentine; production was by Vickers, Metro-Cammell and Birmingham Railway The tank had a riveted hull, was powered by AEC A189 135 hp petrol engine and equipped with a 2-pounder gun and a coaxial Besa machine gun. Its two-man turret forced the commander to act as the loader.
Valentine II (Tank, Infantry, Mk III*): (700)
 Until the Valentine name adopted in June 1941, known as "Tank, Infantry, Mark III*". This model used AEC A190 131 hp 6-cylinder diesel engine. To increase its range in the desert, an auxiliary jettisonable external fuel tank was installed to the left of the engine compartment.

Valentine III
 Modifications to the turret design – moving the front turret plate forward and a larger rear bulge – gave room for a loader to ease the duties of the commander.
Valentine IIICS (Close Support)
 New Zealand modification of 18 Valentine III carried out by replacing the 2 pounder with a 3" Howitzer from Matilda IVCS tanks. They were used in Guadalcanal in the Solomon Islands (see Battle of the Green Islands), and remained in service into the 1950s.
Valentine IV
 A Mark II using an American 138 hp GMC 6004 diesel engine and US-made transmission. Though it had slightly shorter range, it was quieter and highly reliable.
Valentine V
 As the Valentine III but with the GMC 6004 diesel and US-made transmission.
Valentine VI
 Canadian-built version of Mk IV; initially known as Tank, Infantry Mark III***. It used some Canadian and American mechanical parts and a GMC diesel engine. Late production vehicles had cast glacis detail, along with more use of cast sections instead of fabricated ones. The first fifteen were produced with a 7.92 mm Besa coaxial machine-gun, thereafter replaced by a coaxial 0.30-inch Browning machine-gun.

Valentine VII
 Another Canadian version, it was essentially the VI with internal changes and No. 19 Wireless replaced the No. 11 radio set.
Valentine VIIA
 Mark VII with jettisonable fuel tanks, new studded tracks, oil cooler and protected headlights.
Valentine VIII
 AEC diesel engine and turret modification to take 6-pounder gun; meant the loss of the coaxial machine-gun. Never built due to being inferior to Mk IX.
Valentine IX
 A V upgraded to the 6-pounder gun as VIII. Similar armour reduction as on the Mk VIII; on late production units an upgraded, 165 hp version of the GMC 6004 diesel was installed, somewhat improving mobility.

Valentine X(135)
 New turret design so that a Besa coaxial machine-gun could be mounted again. Welded construction; the 165 hp engine was used in place of the 130 hp engine in some production.
Valentine XI
An X upgraded with the OQF 75 mm gun and 210 hp version of the GMC 6004 diesel; welded construction. The Canadian cast nose introduced into British production, only used as a command tank.

Valentine DD
 Valentine Mk V, IX and Mk XI, made amphibious by the use of Nicholas Straussler's "Duplex Drive". Conversions by Metro-Cammell of 625 tanks delivered in 1943–1944. Used by crews training for the M4 Sherman DD tanks for the Normandy Landings as well as training in Italy and India. A few were used in Italy in 1945.
Valentine OP / Command
 Artillery Observation Post and Command Vehicle; extra radios, to give more space inside, the gun was removed and a dummy barrel fitted to the front of the turret. Used by battery commanders and observation post for Archer units.
Valentine CDL
 Continuation of Canal Defence Light experiments; conventional turret replaced with one containing a searchlight.
Valentine Scorpion II
 Mine flail; turretless vehicle with flail attachment never used operationally.
Valentine AMRA Mk Ib
 Armoured Mine Roller Attachment, a few used on the beaches of Normandy during D-Day.
Valentine Snake
 Mine exploder; using "Snake" mine-clearing line charge equipment; a few used operationally.
Valentine Bridgelayer
Used in action in Italy, Burma, north-west Europe and Manchuria.
Valentine with 6-pounder anti-tank mounting
 Experimental vehicle built by Vickers-Armstrong to examine the possibility of producing a simple tank destroyer by mounting the 6-pounder in its field carriage on the hull in place of the turret. Trials only, 1942 not required since the Valentine could be fitted with a 6-pounder in a turret.
Valentine flame-throwers
 Two Valentine tanks were modified to carry flame-throwers and were tested by the Petroleum Warfare Department to determine which system was best for a tank-mounted flame projector. One used a projector pressurised by slow burning cordite charges (designed by the Ministry of Supply) and one designed by AEC with the PWD using a projector operated by compressed hydrogen gas. Both carried the flame-thrower fuel in a trailer and the flame projector was mounted on the hull front. Trials started in 1942 and showed that the gas-operated system was better. From this test installation was developed the Crocodile equipment for the Churchill Crocodile flame-thrower used in the North West Europe campaign in 1944–45.
Valentine 9.75-inch flame mortar
 Experimental vehicle with the turret replaced by fixed heavy mortar intended to fire 25 lb TNT incendiary shells to demolish concrete emplacements. Trials only by the Petroleum Warfare Dept, 1943–45. Few used in Normandy on D-Day to help clear buildings.
Burmark
 "Ark" design using Valentine hull for a light ramp tank to be used in Far East. The end of the war precluded further development.
Gap Jumping Tank
 Experiments with rockets late in the war to propel a Valentine tank across an obstacle such as a minefield.

Gallery

Operators

 Canadian Army received 30 of 1,420 tanks built in Canada. Valentines were used for training purposes.

 11th Infantry Battalion repaired two Valentine wrecks in Tobruk.
 1st Czechoslovak Independent Armoured Brigade Group received Valentines in spring 1943. These tanks were the first ones officially operated by the Czechoslovak exile army in WWII.

 Egyptian Army used Valentine tanks after WWII; used in Mandatory Palestine during 1948 Arab-Israeli War, then relegated to training.

 Imperial Iranian Ground Forces received some ex-Lend Lease tanks from the USSR after WWII.

 Captured Valentines were pressed into service with the Afrika Korps and were designated Infanterie Panzerkampfwagen Mk III 749 (e).

 New Zealand received
 100 Valentine II
 75 Valentine III, 18 converted to Valentine IIICS
 81 Valentine V
 11 Valentine Bridgelayers

 Polish 1st Armoured Division and various other units of Polish Armed Forces in the West operated Valentine tanks for training.

 Romanian Army captured four Mk III tanks from the Red Army, which were used for testing and anti-tank training.

 Red Army received 2,124 British-built and 1,208 Canadian-built Lend-Lease tanks. 270 and 180 lost during transportation.

 The Turkish Army received 200 Valentine IIIs between 1941 and 1944.

Vehicles based on Valentine chassis
 SP 17 pounder, Valentine, Mk I, Archer
 Carrier, Valentine, 25pounder gun Mk I, Bishop
 Tank, Infantry, Valiant (A38)

Surviving tanks

Around forty Valentine tanks and vehicles based on the Valentine chassis survive. Tanks in running condition are at the Bovington Tank Museum (Mark IX) and in private hands in New Zealand and the United Kingdom. The Bovington collection has a Mark II and a Valentine Scissors Bridgelayer. Other examples are displayed at the Imperial War Museum Duxford in the UK; the Royal Military Museum in Brussels, Belgium; the Musée des Blindés, Saumur, France and the Kubinka Tank Museum, Russia; the South African National Museum of Military History. In the United States, the Military Vehicle Technology Foundation and the Virginia Museum of Military Vehicles own Valentines.

The Cavalry Tank Museum Ahmednagar, India have a Valentine Tank and a Valentine Bridgelayer.

A number of Valentine hulls are in private ownership in Australia, including one in the Australian Armour and Artillery Museum. These were sent there after the war for use as agricultural vehicles.

Two Canadian-built Valentines survive. Valentine Tank Mk VIIA, no. 838, built May 1943, was a Lend-Lease tank shipped to the Soviet Union. It fell through the ice of a boggy river near Telepyne, Ukraine (Russian: Telepino), during a Soviet counter-offensive on 25 January 1944. In 1990 a 74-year-old villager helped locate the tank and it was recovered and offered as a Glasnost-era gift to Canada. It was presented to the Canadian War Museum by independent Ukraine in 1992 and stands on display in the LeBreton Gallery. A Valentine built by Canadian Pacific resides at the Base Borden Military Museum in Barrie, Ontario.

A notable survivor is the only intact DD Valentine. This has been restored to running condition and is in the United Kingdom, privately owned by John Pearson. A number of DD Valentines that sank during training lie off the British coast; several have been located and are regularly visited by recreational divers. Two Valentines lie in the Moray Firth in Scotland and two lie  out of Poole Bay in Dorset.

In October 2012, a Valentine Mk IX tank that fell through ice while crossing a river in western Poland during the Soviet Army's march to Berlin was recovered. This, the only surviving Valentine Mk IX to have actually seen combat, is reportedly well preserved and could possibly be restored to operational condition.

See also

 Vickers Tank Periscope MK.IV

References
Notes

Citations

Bibliography

Further reading

External links

 Valentine production and performance data
 WWII Vehicles website about the Valentine
 The 3rd NZ Division Tank Squadron
 Valentine Tank videos
 Recovery of Valentine from Warta riverbed

Infantry tanks
World War II tanks of the United Kingdom
Military vehicles introduced from 1940 to 1944
Vickers
History of the tank